Kardhikaq (romanized: Gardikáki) is a small village in Vlorë County, southern Albania. At the 2015 local government reform it became part of the municipality of Finiq. It is inhabited by a mix population of Greeks and Aromanians.

Demographics 
According to Ottoman statistics, the village had 164 inhabitants in 1895. In 1993, the village had a mix population of Greeks and Aromanians, numbering 215 inhabitants.

References 

Villages in Vlorë County
Greek communities in Albania
Aromanian settlements in Albania